The Muddle-Headed Wombat is a fictional wombat featured in the radio serials and later in the children's books of the same name written by Australian author Ruth Park. The books are considered classics of Australian children's literature.

History
In 1941 the Australian Broadcasting Commission decided to nationalise its Children's programs, broadcast from Sydney with Ida Elizabeth Osbourne as its first producer. In 1942 she commissioned Ruth Park to write a dramatised series, The Wide–Awake Bunyip. The first episode was aired in January 1943, with "Joe" (Albert Collins) in the title role. When he died, in 1951, Ruth changed the title to The Muddle–Headed Wombat, with Leonard Teale the first to play the part. When Leonard left, John Ewart "Jimmy" made it his for the next 18 years. The part of his friend "Mouse" in both incarnations was played by the current female co-presenter. When John E. C. Appleton was made Supervisor of Children's Programs and keen to be involved, the part of "Tabby Cat" was created for him. The narrator throughout was "Mac" (Atholl Fleming).

In total, the series ran for 3129 episodes. The popularity of the series (which ended when the Children's Hour was cancelled in 1971) led Ruth Park to write her Muddle–Headed Wombat books. In 1981 and 1982, in response to popular demand the ABC re-recorded many of the earliest episodes.

Synopsis
The Muddle-Headed Wombat books follow the Muddle-Headed Wombat and his friends, a good-natured, practical female mouse and a vain, neurotic male tabby cat. The characters call each other simply Wombat, Mouse and Tabby. The idea for the character arose when Park's daughter made the comment that "I don't think there's anyone in the world I'm smarter than."

Wombat's speech is peppered with malapropisms and spoonerisms, e.g. treely ruly for really and truly, lawn the mow for mow the lawn and Cindergorilla for Cinderella. He has a bicycle with red wheels, of which he is intensely proud and which he anthropomorphises, e.g. complaining that it bit him when he accidentally injured himself trying to repair it.

Books
The Muddle Headed Wombat series of books was published from 1962 to 1971 by Educational Press Pty Ltd
,
who commissioned Ruth Park to write books based on the radio show. Noela Young (died 5 April 2018) illustrated these books.

In 1971 the rights were transferred to Angus and Robertson Pty Ltd, who commissioned the later books and reprinted those originally published by Educational Press.

 The Muddle-Headed Wombat 1962
 The Muddle-Headed Wombat on Holiday 1964
 The Muddle-Headed Wombat in the Treetops 1965
 The Muddle-Headed Wombat at School 1966
 The Muddle-Headed Wombat in the Snow 1966
 The Muddle-Headed Wombat on a Rainy Day 1969
 The Muddle Headed Wombat in the Springtime 1970
 The Muddle-Headed Wombat on the River 1970
 The Muddle-Headed Wombat and the Bush Band 1973
 The Muddle-Headed Wombat and the Invention 1975
 The Muddle-Headed Wombat on Clean-Up Day 1976
 The Adventures of the Muddle-Headed Wombat 1979
 The Muddle-Headed Wombat 1979, contains:
The Muddle-Headed Wombat
The Muddle-Headed Wombat on Holiday
The Muddle-Headed Wombat in the Treetops
The Muddle-Headed Wombat at School
 More Adventures of the Muddle-Headed Wombat 1980
 The Muddle-Headed Wombat is Very Bad 1981
 The Muddle-Headed Wombat Stays at Home 1982

Film
In Ukraine in 1990 was released short animated film  directed by Serguei Kouchnerov on Ukranimafilm studio.

References 

Children's fiction books
Series of children's books
Characters in children's literature
Fictional wombats
Books by Ruth Park
1962 children's books